Ghidighici Stadium is a football stadium located in Ghidighici, Moldova. It has a capacity of 1,500 seats.

Football venues in Moldova